Botlikh is a rural locality (a selo) and the administrative center of Botlikhsky District of the Republic of Dagestan, Russia. Population:  During the Russian Empire, the settlement was the administrative capital of the Andiysky Okrug.

References

Sources 

Rural localities in Botlikhsky District